David Mark Kramer (born 1961) is an American biophysicist.

Kramer earned a Bachelor of Science degree at the University of Dayton in biology, then completed a master's of science in cell biology at the same institution. In 1990, Kramer completed a doctorate in biophysics at the University of Illinois. He is the Hannah Distinguished Professor in Photosynthesis and Bioenergetics at Michigan State University.

References

Living people
1961 births
American biophysicists
University of Dayton alumni
University of Illinois alumni
Michigan State University faculty